The 1990–91 Texas Longhorns men's basketball team represented The University of Texas at Austin in intercollegiate basketball competition during the 1990–91 season. The Longhorns were led by third-year head coach Tom Penders. The team finished the season with a 23–9 overall record and finished second in Southwest Conference play with a 13–3 conference record. Texas advanced to the NCAA tournament, recording an opening round win over Saint Peter's before falling to St. John's in the second round.

Roster

Schedule and results

|-
!colspan=12 style=| Regular season

|-
!colspan=12 style="background:#CC5500; color:white;"| Southwest Conference tournament

|-
!colspan=12 style="background:#CC5500; color:white;"| 1991 NCAA Tournament – Midwest No. 5 seed

Rankings

References

Texas Longhorns men's basketball seasons
Texas
Texas
Texas Longhorns Basketball Team
Texas Longhorns Basketball Team